Dailuoding is a Buddhist temple located in on Mount Wutai of Taihuai Town, in Wutai County, Shanxi, China. The temple has been listed among the first group of National Key Buddhist Temples in Han Chinese Area in 1983.

History
According to the Records of Mount Qingliang, the temple was originally called "Foding'an" in the Tang dynasty (618–907) and changed to "Daluoding" in 1592 during the Wanli era of the Ming dynasty (1368–1644). In 1750, in the region of Qianlong Emperor of the Qing dynasty (1644–1911), the temple was renamed "Dailuoding" which is still in use now.

Architecture
The temple is built along the hillside. Along the central axis of the temple stand five buildings including the Paifang, Four Heavenly Kings Hall, Danchan Hall, Manjushri Hall and Mahavira Hall.

Manjushri Hall
Five statues of Manjushri with different appearance enshrined in the hall. In the spring of 1750, Qianlong Emperor visited Mount Wutai and wrote a poem to eulogize the hall.

Mahavira Hall
Behind the Manjushri Hall is the Mahavira Hall enshrining the statues of Sakyamuni, Amitabha and Bhaisajyaguru. The two disciples' statues are placed in front of the statue of Sakyamuni, the older is called Kassapa Buddha and the middle-aged is called Ananda. The statues of Eighteen Arhats stand on both sides of the hall.

References

Buddhist temples on Mount Wutai
Buildings and structures in Xinzhou
Tourist attractions in Xinzhou
19th-century establishments in China
19th-century Buddhist temples
Wutai County